Niklas Sirén (born July 17, 1989) is a Finnish professional ice hockey player. He is currently playing for Hermes of the Finnish Suomi-sarja.

Sirén made his Liiga debut playing with HIFK during the 2007–08 Liiga season.

References

External links

1989 births
Living people
Kokkolan Hermes players
Imatran Ketterä players
SaPKo players
HIFK (ice hockey) players
KooKoo players
Finnish ice hockey forwards
People from Hämeenlinna
Sportspeople from Kanta-Häme